Neeve is an English and Scottish surname. The name is of Anglo Norman origin meaning the nephew. The surname is well known in Norfolk, a county in East Anglia, England.

References

External links
 https://www.forebears.co.uk/surnames/neeve

Surnames
Scottish surnames
Surnames of English origin